Dialectical materialism is a philosophy of science, a philosophy of history, and a philosophy of Nature based upon the writings of Karl Marx and Friedrich Engels. As a materialist philosophy, Marxist dialectics emphasizes the importance of real-world conditions and the presence of functional contradictions within and among social relations, which derive from, but are not limited to the contradictions that occur in social class, labour economics, and socioeconomic interactions.

In contrast with the idealist perspective of  Hegelian dialectics, the materialist perspective of Marxist dialectics emphasizes that contradictions in material phenomena could be resolved with dialectical analysis, from which is synthesized the solution that resolves the contradiction, whilst retaining the essence of the phenomena. The philosopher Marx proposed that the most effective solution to the problems caused by contradiction was to address the contradiction and then rearrange the systems of social organization that are the root of the problem.

Dialectical materialism recognises the evolution of the natural world, and thus the emergence of new qualities of being human and of human existence. The philosopher Engels used the metaphysical insight that the higher level of human existence emerges from and is rooted in the lower level of human existence. That the higher level of being is a new order with irreducible laws, and that evolution is governed by laws of development, which reflect the basic properties of matter in motion.

In the 1930s, in the U.S.S.R., the book Dialectical and Historical Materialism (1938), by Stalin, was the Soviet formulations of dialectical materialism and of historical materialism, which was  taught in the soviet system of education. In the People's Republic of China, the analogous text was the essay On Contradiction (1937), by Mao Zedong, which was a foundation document of Maoism.

The term 
The term dialectical materialism was coined in 1887 by Joseph Dietzgen, a socialist who corresponded with Marx, during and after the failed 1848 German Revolution. Casual mention of the term "dialectical materialism" is also found in the biography Frederick Engels, by philosopher Karl Kautsky, written in 1899. Marx himself had talked about the "materialist conception of history", which was later referred to as "historical materialism" by Engels. Engels further explained the "materialist dialectic" in his Dialectics of Nature in 1883. Georgi Plekhanov, the father of Russian Marxism, first used the term "dialectical materialism" in 1891 in his writings on Georg Wilhelm Friedrich Hegel and Marx. Stalin further delineated and defined dialectical and historical materialism as the world outlook of Marxism–Leninism, and as a method to study society and its history.

Historical background 
Marx and Engels each began their adulthood as Young Hegelians, one of several groups of intellectuals inspired by the philosopher Hegel. Marx's doctoral thesis, The Difference Between the Democritean and Epicurean Philosophy of Nature, was concerned with the atomism of Epicurus and Democritus, which is considered the foundation of materialist philosophy. Marx was also familiar with Lucretius's theory of clinamen.

Marx and Engels both concluded that Hegelian philosophy, at least as interpreted by their former colleagues, was too abstract and was being misapplied in attempts to explain the social injustice in recently industrializing countries such as Germany, France, and the United Kingdom, which was a growing concern in the early 1840s, as exemplified by Dickensian inequity.

In contrast to the conventional Hegelian dialectic of the day, which emphasized the idealist observation that human experience is dependent on the mind's perceptions, Marx developed Marxist dialectics, which emphasized the materialist view that the world of the concrete shapes socioeconomic interactions and that those in turn determine sociopolitical reality.

Whereas some Hegelians blamed religious alienation (estrangement from the traditional comforts of religion) for societal ills, Marx and Engels concluded that alienation from economic and political autonomy, coupled with exploitation and poverty, was the real culprit.

In keeping with dialectical ideas, Marx and Engels thus created an alternative theory, not only of why the world is the way it is but also of which actions people should take to make it the way it ought to be. In Theses on Feuerbach (1845), Marx wrote, "The philosophers have only interpreted the world, in various ways. The point, however, is to change it." Dialectical materialism is thus closely related to Marx's and Engels's historical materialism (and has sometimes been viewed as synonymous with it). Marx rejected Fichte's language of "thesis, antithesis, synthesis".

Dialectical materialism is an aspect of the broader subject of materialism, which asserts the primacy of the material world: in short, matter precedes thought. Materialism is a realist philosophy of science, which holds that the world is material; that all phenomena in the universe consist of "matter in motion," wherein all things are interdependent and interconnected and develop according to natural law; that the world exists outside us and independently of our perception of it; that thought is a reflection of the material world in the brain, and that the world is in principle knowable.

Marx criticized classical materialism as another idealist philosophy—idealist because of its transhistorical understanding of material contexts. The Young Hegelian Ludwig Feuerbach had rejected Hegel's idealistic philosophy and advocated materialism. Despite being strongly influenced by Feuerbach, Marx rejected Feuerbach's version of materialism (anthropological materialism) as inconsistent. The writings of Engels, especially Anti-Dühring (1878) and Dialectics of Nature (1875–82), were the source of the main doctrines of dialectical materialism.

Marx's dialectics 

The concept of dialectical materialism emerges from statements by Marx in the second edition postface to his magnum opus, Das Kapital. There Marx says he intends to use Hegelian dialectics but in revised form. He defends Hegel against those who view him as a "dead dog" and then says, "I openly avowed myself as the pupil of that mighty thinker Hegel". Marx credits Hegel with "being the first to present [dialectic's] form of working in a comprehensive and conscious manner". But he then criticizes Hegel for turning dialectics upside down: "With him it is standing on its head. It must be turned right side up again, if you would discover the rational kernel within the mystical shell.".

Marx's criticism of Hegel asserts that Hegel's dialectics go astray by dealing with ideas, with the human mind. Hegel's dialectic, Marx says, inappropriately concerns "the process of the human brain"; it focuses on ideas.  Hegel's thought is in fact sometimes called dialectical idealism, and Hegel himself is counted among a number of other philosophers known as the German idealists.  Marx, on the contrary, believed that dialectics should deal not with the mental world of ideas but with "the material world", the world of production and other economic activity. For Marx, a contradiction can be solved by a desperate struggle to change the social world. This was a very important transformation because it allowed him to move dialectics out of the contextual subject of philosophy and into the study of social relations based on the material world.

For Marx, human history cannot be fitted into any neat a priori schema. He explicitly rejects the idea of Hegel's followers that history can be understood as "a person apart, a metaphysical subject of which real human individuals are but the bearers". To interpret history as though previous social formations have somehow been aiming themselves toward the present state of affairs is "to misunderstand the historical movement by which the successive generations transformed the results acquired by the generations that preceded them". Marx's rejection of this sort of teleology was one reason for his enthusiastic (though not entirely uncritical) reception of Charles Darwin's theory of natural selection.

For Marx, dialectics is not a formula for generating predetermined outcomes but is a method for the empirical study of social processes in terms of interrelations, development, and transformation. In his introduction to the Penguin edition of Marx's Capital, Ernest Mandel writes, "When the dialectical method is applied to the study of economic problems, economic phenomena are not viewed separately from each other, by bits and pieces, but in their inner connection as an integrated totality, structured around, and by, a basic predominant mode of production."

Marx's own writings are almost exclusively concerned with understanding human history in terms of systemic processes, based on modes of production (broadly speaking, the ways in which societies are organized to employ their technological powers to interact with their material surroundings). This is called historical materialism. More narrowly, within the framework of this general theory of history, most of Marx's writing is devoted to an analysis of the specific structure and development of the capitalist economy.

For his part, Engels applies a "dialectical" approach to the natural world in general, arguing that contemporary science is increasingly recognizing the necessity of viewing natural processes in terms of interconnectedness, development, and transformation. Some scholars have doubted that Engels' "dialectics of nature" is a legitimate extension of Marx's approach to social processes. Other scholars have argued that despite Marx's insistence that humans are natural beings in an evolving, mutual relationship with the rest of nature, Marx's own writings pay inadequate attention to the ways in which human agency is constrained by such factors as biology, geography, and ecology.

Engels's dialectics 
Engels postulated three laws of dialectics from his reading of Hegel's Science of Logic. Engels elucidated these laws as the materialist dialectic in his work Dialectics of Nature:

 The law of the unity and conflict of opposites
 The law of the passage of quantitative changes into qualitative changes
 The law of the negation of the negation

The first law, which originates with the ancient Ionian philosopher Heraclitus, can be clarified through the following examples:

The first law was seen by both Hegel and Vladimir Lenin as the central feature of a dialectical understanding of things:

The second law Hegel took from Ancient Greek philosophers, notably the paradox of the heap, and explanation by Aristotle, and it is equated with what scientists call phase transitions. It may be traced to the ancient Ionian philosophers, particularly Anaximenes from whom Aristotle, Hegel, and Engels inherited the concept. For all these authors, one of the main illustrations is the phase transitions of water. There has also been an effort to apply this mechanism to social phenomena, whereby population increases result in changes in social structure. The law of the passage of quantitative changes into qualitative changes can also be applied to the process of social change and class conflict.

The third law, "negation of the negation", originated with Hegel. Although Hegel coined the term "negation of the negation", it gained its fame from Marx's using it in Capital.  There Marx wrote this: "The [death] knell of capitalist private property sounds.  The expropriators are expropriated.  The capitalist mode of appropriation, the result of the capitalist mode of production, produces capitalist private property.  This is the first negation of individual private property ... But capitalist production begets, with the inexorability of a law of Nature, its own negation. It [this new negation] is the negation of negation."

Z. A. Jordan notes, "Engels made constant use of the metaphysical insight that the higher level of existence emerges from and has its roots in the lower; that the higher level constitutes a new order of being with its irreducible laws; and that this process of evolutionary advance is governed by laws of development which reflect basic properties of 'matter in motion as a whole'."

Lenin's contributions 

After reading Hegel's Science of Logic in 1914, Lenin made some brief notes outlining three "elements" of logic. They are:

 The determination of the concept out of itself [the thing itself must be considered in its relations and in its development];
 The contradictory nature of the thing itself (the other of itself), the contradictory forces and tendencies in each phenomenon;
 The union of analysis and synthesis.

Lenin develops these in a further series of notes, and appears to argue that "the transition of quantity into quality and vice versa" is an example of the unity and opposition of opposites expressed tentatively as "not only the unity of opposites but the transitions of every determination, quality, feature, side, property into every other [into its opposite?]."

In his essay "On the Question of Dialectics", Lenin stated, "Development is the 'struggle' of opposites."
He stated, "The unity (coincidence, identity, equal action) of opposites is conditional, temporary, transitory, relative. The struggle of mutually exclusive opposites is absolute, just as development and motion are absolute."

In Materialism and Empiriocriticism (1908), Lenin explained dialectical materialism as three axes: (i) the materialist inversion of Hegelian dialectics, (ii) the historicity of ethical principles ordered to class struggle, and (iii) the convergence of "laws of evolution" in physics (Helmholtz), biology (Darwin), and in political economy (Marx). Hence, Lenin was philosophically positioned between historicist Marxism (Labriola) and determinist Marxism—a political position close to "social Darwinism" (Kautsky) . Moreover, late-century discoveries in physics (x-rays, electrons), and the beginning of quantum mechanics, philosophically challenged previous conceptions of matter and materialism, thus matter seemed to be disappearing. Lenin disagreed:
'Matter disappears' means that the limit within which we have hitherto known matter disappears, and that our knowledge is penetrating deeper; properties of matter are disappearing that formerly seemed absolute, immutable, and primary, and which are now revealed to be relative and characteristic only of certain states of matter. For the sole 'property' of matter, with whose recognition philosophical materialism is bound up, is the property of being an objective reality, of existing outside of the mind.

Lenin was developing the work of Engels, who said that "with each epoch-making discovery, even in the sphere of natural science, materialism has to change its form". One of Lenin's challenges was distancing materialism, as a viable philosophical outlook, from the "vulgar materialism" expressed in the statement "the brain secretes thought in the same way as the liver secretes bile" (attributed to 18th-century physician Pierre Jean Georges Cabanis); "metaphysical materialism" (matter composed of immutable particles); and 19th-century "mechanical materialism" (matter as random molecules interacting per the laws of mechanics). The philosophic solution that Lenin (and Engels) proposed was "dialectical materialism", wherein matter is defined as objective reality, theoretically consistent with (new) developments occurring in the sciences.

Lenin reassessed Feuerbach's philosophy and concluded that it was in line with dialectical materialism.

Trotsky's contributions 
In 1926, Trotsky said in a speech:

Lukács's contributions 
György Lukács, Minister of Culture in the brief Béla Kun government of the Hungarian Soviet Republic (1919), published History and Class Consciousness (1923), in which he defined dialectical materialism as the knowledge of society as a whole, knowledge which, in itself, was the class consciousness of the proletariat. In the first chapter "What is Orthodox Marxism?", Lukács defined orthodoxy as fidelity to the "Marxist method", not fidelity to "dogmas":
Orthodox Marxism, therefore, does not imply the uncritical acceptance of the results of Marx's investigations. It is not the "belief" in this or that thesis, nor the exegesis of a "sacred" book. On the contrary, orthodoxy refers exclusively to method. It is the scientific conviction that dialectical materialism is the road to truth and that its methods can be developed, expanded, and deepened, only along the lines laid down by its founders. (§1)
In his later works and actions, Lukács became a leader of Democratic Marxism. He modified many of his formulations of his 1923 works and went on to develop a Marxist ontology and played an active role in democratic movements in Hungary in 1956 and the 1960s. He and his associates became sharply critical of the formulation of dialectical materialism in the Soviet Union that was exported to those countries under its control. In the 1960s, his associates became known as the Budapest School.

Lukács, in his philosophical criticism of Marxist revisionism, proposed an intellectual return to the Marxist method. So did Louis Althusser, who later defined Marxism and psychoanalysis as "conflictual sciences", stating that political factions and revisionism are inherent to Marxist theory and political praxis, because dialectical materialism is the philosophic product of class struggle:

For this reason, the task of orthodox Marxism, its victory over Revisionism and utopianism can never mean the defeat, once and for all, of false tendencies. It is an ever-renewed struggle against the insidious effects of bourgeois ideology on the thought of the proletariat. Marxist orthodoxy is no guardian of traditions, it is the eternally vigilant prophet proclaiming the relation between the tasks of the immediate present and the totality of the historical process. (§5)
...the premise of dialectical materialism is, we recall: 'It is not men's consciousness that determines their existence, but, on the contrary, their social existence that determines their consciousness'.... Only when the core of existence stands revealed as a social process can existence be seen as the product, albeit the hitherto unconscious product, of human activity. (§5)

Philosophically aligned with Marx is the criticism of the individualist, bourgeois philosophy of the subject, which is founded upon the voluntary and conscious subject. Against said ideology is the primacy of social relations. Existence—and thus the world—is the product of human activity, but this can be seen only by accepting the primacy of social process on individual consciousness. This type of consciousness is an effect of ideological mystification.

At the 5th Congress of the Communist International (July 1924), Grigory Zinoviev formally denounced Lukács's heterodox definition of Orthodox Marxism as exclusively derived from fidelity to the "Marxist method", and not to Communist party dogmas; and denounced the philosophical developments of the German Marxist theorist Karl Korsch.

Stalin's contributions 
In the 1930s, Stalin and his associates formulated a version of dialectical and historical materialism that became the "official" Soviet interpretation of Marxism. It was codified in Stalin's work, Dialectical and Historical Materialism (1938), and popularized in textbooks used for compulsory education within the Soviet Union and throughout the Eastern Bloc.

Mao's contributions 
In On Contradiction (1937), Mao Zedong outlined a version of dialectical materialism that subsumed two of Engels's three principal laws of dialectics, "the transformation of quantity into quality" and "the negation of the negation" as sub-laws (and not principal laws of their own) of the first law, "the unity and interpenetration of opposites".

As a heuristic in science and elsewhere 
Historian of science Loren Graham has detailed at length the role played by dialectical materialism in the Soviet Union in disciplines throughout the natural and social sciences. He has concluded that, despite the Lysenko period in genetics and constraints on free inquiry imposed by political authorities, dialectical materialism had a positive influence on the work of many Soviet scientists.

Some evolutionary biologists, such as Richard Lewontin and Stephen Jay Gould, have tried to employ dialectical materialism in their approach. They view dialectics as playing a precautionary heuristic role in their work. From Lewontin's perspective, we get this idea:

Dialectical materialism is not, and never has been, a programmatic method for solving particular physical problems. Rather, a dialectical analysis provides an overview and a set of warning signs against particular forms of dogmatism and narrowness of thought. It tells us, "Remember that history may leave an important trace. Remember that being and becoming are dual aspects of nature. Remember that conditions change and that the conditions necessary to the initiation of some process may be destroyed by the process itself. Remember to pay attention to real objects in time and space and not lose them in utterly idealized abstractions. Remember that the qualitative effects of context and interaction may be lost when phenomena are isolated". And above all else, "Remember that all the other caveats are only reminders and warning signs whose application to different circumstances of the real world is contingent."

Gould shared similar views regarding a heuristic role for dialectical materialism. He wrote that:

... dialectical thinking should be taken more seriously by Western scholars, not discarded because some nations of the second world have constructed a cardboard version as an official political doctrine.
... when presented as guidelines for a philosophy of change, not as dogmatic precepts true by fiat, the three classical laws of dialectics embody a holistic vision that views change as interaction among components of complete systems and sees the components themselves not as a priori entities, but as both products and inputs to the system. Thus, the law of "interpenetrating opposites" records the inextricable interdependence of components: the "transformation of quantity to quality" defends a systems-based view of change that translates incremental inputs into alterations of state, and the "negation of negation" describes the direction given to history because complex systems cannot revert exactly to previous states.

This heuristic was also applied to the theory of punctuated equilibrium proposed by Gould and Niles Eldredge. They wrote that "history, as Hegel said, moves upward in a spiral of negations", and that "punctuated equilibria is a model for discontinuous tempos of change (in) the process of speciation and the deployment of species in geological time." They noted that "the law of transformation of quantity into quality... holds that a new quality emerges in a leap as the slow accumulation of quantitative changes, long resisted by a stable system, finally forces it rapidly from one state into another", a phenomenon described in some disciplines as a paradigm shift. Apart from the commonly cited example of water turning to steam with increased temperature, Gould and Eldredge noted another analogy in information theory, "with its jargon of equilibrium, steady state, and homeostasis maintained by negative feedback", and "extremely rapid transitions that occur with positive feedback".

Lewontin, Gould, and Eldredge were thus more interested in dialectical materialism as a heuristic than a dogmatic form of 'truth' or a statement of their politics. Nevertheless, they found a readiness for critics to "seize upon" key statements and portray punctuated equilibrium, and exercises associated with it, such as public exhibitions, as a "Marxist plot".

The Communist Party's official interpretation of Marxism, dialectical materialism, fit Alexander Oparin's studies on the origins of life as 'a flow, an exchange, a dialectical unity'. This notion was re-enforced by Oparin's association with Lysenko.

In 1972, the worst chaos of China's Cultural Revolution was over and scientific research resumed. Astrophysicist and cosmologist Fang Lizhi found an opportunity to read some recent astrophysics papers in western journals, and soon wrote his first paper on cosmology, "A Cosmological Solution in Scalar-tensor Theory with Mass and Blackbody Radiation", which was published on the journal Wu Li (Physics), Vol. 1, 163 (1972). This was the first modern cosmological research paper in mainland China. Fang assembled a group of young faculty members of USTC around him to conduct astrophysics research.

At the time, conducting research on relativity theory and cosmology in China was very risky politically, because these theories were considered to be "idealistic" theories in contradiction with the dialectical materialism theory, which is the official philosophy of the Communist Party. According to the dialectical materialism philosophy, both time and space must be infinite, while the Big Bang theory allows the possibility of the finiteness of space and time. During the Cultural Revolution, campaigns were waged against Albert Einstein and the Theory of Relativity in Beijing and Shanghai. Once Fang published his theory, some of the critics of the Theory of Relativity, especially a group based in Shanghai, prepared to attack Fang politically. However, by this time the "leftist" line was declining in the Chinese academia. Professor Dai Wensai, the most well-known Chinese astronomer at the time and chair of the Astronomy Department of Nanjing University, also supported Fang. Many of the members of the "Theory of Relativity Criticism Group" changed to study the theory and conduct research in it. Subsequently, Fang was regarded as the father of cosmological research in China.

Criticism
Philosopher Allen Wood argued that, in its form as an official Soviet philosophy, dialectical materialism was doomed to be superficial because "creativity or critical thinking" was impossible in an authoritarian environment. Nevertheless, he considered the basic aims and principles of dialectical materialism to be in harmony with rational scientific thought.

Economist and philosopher Ludwig von Mises wrote a critique of Marxist materialism which he published as a part of his 1957 work Theory and History: An Interpretation of Social and Economic Evolution. H. B. Acton described the creed as "a philosophical farrago". Max Eastman argued that dialectical materialism lacks a psychological basis.

Of the term
Joseph Needham, an influential historian of science and a Christian who nonetheless was an adherent of dialectical materialism, suggested that a more appropriate term might be "dialectical organicism".

Marxist rejection

Marxist humanist Leszek Kolakowski argued that dialectical materialism was not truly Marxist.

See also

Books
 Fundamentals of Marxism–Leninism
 Dialectical Materialism and Historical Materialism

Concepts
 Classical Marxism
 Critique of political economy
 Dialectical monism
 Marxist philosophy of nature
 Methodological naturalism
 Orthodox Marxism
 Parametric determinism
 Philosophical realism
 Philosophy in the Soviet Union

People
 Alexander Spirkin
 Fidel Castro
 Ludovico Geymonat
 Maurice Cornforth
 Shulamith Firestone
 Teodor Oizerman

References

Further reading

 V. G. Afanasyev, Dialectical Materialism
 Afanasyev, Marxist Philosophy (Chapter 4 to Chapter 9)
 Louis Althusser, On the Materialist Dialectic
 Eftichios Bitsakis, Physique contemporaine et matérialisme dialectique, Éditions Sociales, 1973 .
 Pascal Charbonnat, Histoire des philosophies matérialistes, Syllepse, 2007 (second edition, Kimé, 2013) 
 Maurice Cornforth, Materialism and the Dialectical Method
 Dialectics For Kids
 Friedrich Engels, Ludwig Feuerbach and the End of Classical German Philosophy
 Friedrich Engels, Anti-Dühring
 Friedrich Engels, Dialectics of Nature
 Ghosh, Shibdas. Science of Marxism is the Scientific dialectical methodology
 
 
 Ira Gollobin, Dialectical Materialism: Its Laws, Categories, and Practice, Petras Press, NY, 1986.
 
 
 
 Vassily Krapivin, What Is Dialectical Materialism?
 Ioan, Petru, "Logic and Dialectics" A. I. Cuza University Press, Iaşi 1998.
 Jameson, Fredric. Valences of the Dialectic.  London and New York: Verso, 2009.
 Z. A. Jordan, The Origins of Dialectical Materialism
 M. Dafermos (2021). Rethinking the relationship between Marx's Capital and Hegel's Science of Logic: The tradition of creative Soviet Marxism. Class & Capital.  doi:10.1177/03098168211029003
 
 V. I. Lenin, Materialism and Empirio-Criticism
 V. I. Lenin, On the Question of Dialectics
 György Lukács, History and Class Consciousness
 
 Oizerman, Dialectical Materialism and the History of Philosophy
 Bertell Ollman, Dance of the Dialectic: Steps in Marx's Method
 Bertell Ollman and Tony Smith (ed.), Dialectics for the New Century, Palgrave Macmillan, England, 2008.
 Anton Pannekoek, Materialism And Historical Materialism
 Philosophy in the USSR: Problems of Dialectical Materialism
 Joseph Stalin, Dialectical and Historical Materialism 
 Évariste Sanchez-Palencia, Promenade dialectique dans les sciences, Hermann, 476p., 2012 
 Alexander Spirkin, Dialectical Materialism
 
 Tucker, Robert, Philosophy and Myth in Karl Marx (Cambridge and New York: Cambridge University Press, 1961).
 ABC of Dialectical and Historical Materialism

Dialectic
 
Ideology of the Communist Party of the Soviet Union
Marxist theory
Materialism